A Massachusetts general election was held on November 2, 1982 in the Commonwealth of Massachusetts.

The election included:
 statewide elections for United States Senator, Governor, Lieutenant Governor, Attorney General, Secretary of the Commonwealth, Treasurer, and Auditor;
 district elections for U.S. Representatives, State Representatives, State Senators, and Governor's Councillors; and
 ballot questions at the state and local levels.

Democratic and Republican candidates were selected in party primaries held September 14, 1982.

Governor & Lieutenant Governor

Democrats Michael Dukakis and John Kerry were elected Governor and Lieutenant Governor, respectively, over Republican candidates John W. Sears and Leon Lombardi.

Attorney General

Democrat Francis X. Belotti was elected Attorney General. He defeated Republican Richard L. Wainwright and Libertarian Michael Reilly in the general election.

Secretary of the Commonwealth

Incumbent Secretary of the Commonwealth Michael J. Connolly defeated Republican Jody DeRoma Dow and Libertarian Robin D. Zazula in the general election.

Candidates
Michael J. Connolly, incumbent Secretary of the Commonwealth (Democratic)
Jody Deroma Dow (Republican)
Robin Zazula (Libertarian)

Results

Treasurer and Receiver-General

Incumbent Treasurer and Receiver-General Robert Q. Crane defeated Barnstable County Treasurer Mary J. LeClair and Libertarian Freda L. Nason in the general election.

Candidates
Robert Q. Crane, incumbent Treasurer and Receiver-General (Democratic)
Mary J. LeClair, Barnstable County Treasurer (Republican)
Freda L. Nason (Libertarian)

Results

Auditor

Incumbent Auditor John J. Finnegan defeated Republican Michael S. Robertson and Libertarian Donald E. Washburn in the general election.

Candidates
John J. Finnegan, interim Auditor since 1981 (Democratic)
Michael S. Robertson, nominee for U.S. Senate in 1976 (Republican)
Donald E. Washburn (Libertarian)

Results

United States Senator

Democratic incumbent Ted Kennedy was re-elected over Republican Ray Shamie and Libertarian Howard S. Katz.

Ballot questions

Question 1
Proposed Amendment to the Constitution - The proposed constitutional amendment would remove the constitutional prohibition against the use of public funds to aid or maintain private primary or secondary schools.

Question 2
Proposed Amendment to the Constitution - The proposed constitutional amendment would allow the legislature to enact laws authorizing the state courts to impose the death penalty on the conviction of crimes to be specified by the law.

Question 3
Law Proposed by Initiative Petition - would require that before the construction or operation of any nuclear power plant or low-level radioactive waste storage or disposal facility in the Commonwealth, the legislature must make certain findings and a majority of voters must approve the facility at a statewide election.

Question 4
Referendum on an Existing Law - The law requires that a refundable deposit be paid for certain beverage containers sold in Massachusetts.

References

External links
 

 
Massachusetts